Hans Podlipnik and Stefano Travaglia are the defending champions, but chose not to participate.

Seeds

Draw

References
 Main Draw

Morocco Tennis Tour - Meknes - Doubles
2015 Doubles
Tennis Tour - Meknes - Doubles